Serhii Bohachuk is a Ukrainian professional boxer who has held the WBC Continental Americas super-welterweight title since 2018. He competed for Ukraine on the international amateur level, winning the 2012 Petr Mitsik Youth Memorial, and making it to the quarters of the 2013 Valeriy Arsenov Youth Memorial, and semis of the 2015 Askar Kulibayev Tournament.

Professional career
After competing for the Ukraine Otamans in the World Series of Boxing in 2016, Bohachuk made his professional debut on 3 February 2017, scoring a second-round knockout (KO) victory over Matt Murphy at the Jonathan Club in Los Angeles, California.

After compiling a record of 15–0 (15 KOs) he faced Tyrone Brunson for the vacant WBC Continental Americas super-welterweight title on 27 October 2019 at The Avalon in Los Angeles, California. Bohachuk knocked Brunson to the canvas on three occasions, once in the third round and twice in the fourth, with the third knockdown signalling the end of the fight, giving Bohachuk his sixteenth consecutive stoppage win with a fourth-round KO.

Professional boxing record

References

Living people
Year of birth missing (living people)
Date of birth missing (living people)
Ukrainian male boxers
Light-middleweight boxers
Sportspeople from Vinnytsia